Zhaoxing may refer to:

 Zhaoxing, Guizhou, subdivision and town of Liping County, Guizhou
 Zhaoxing, Heilongjiang (zh), subdivision and town of Luobei County, Heilongjiang